KCAS (91.5 FM) is a non-commercial educational radio station licensed to serve McCook, Texas.  McCook is a dispersed rural community about 20 miles northwest of the county seat, Edinburg, in Hidalgo County, Texas.  The station is owned and operated by Faith Baptist Ministries and the broadcast license is held by Faith Baptist Church, Inc.

KCAS broadcasts a conservative religious radio format to the McAllen, Texas, and the Rio Grande Valley.  News programming on KCAS is provided by SRN News.

History
This station received its original construction permit from the Federal Communications Commission on January 21, 1998.  The new station was assigned the KCAS call sign by the FCC on March 2, 1998.  KCAS received its license to cover from the FCC on April 11, 2001.

References

External links
KCAS official website

Radio stations established in 2001
Hidalgo County, Texas
2001 establishments in Texas
CAS
Baptist Christianity in Texas